Amy Regier is an American politician and a Republican member of the Montana House of Representatives.

She was educated at Flathead High School, and received a degree from Montana State University's College of Nursing. She has worked as a nurse at Kalispell Regional Medical Center. Her father is Keith Regier.

References

Republican Party members of the Montana House of Representatives
Politicians from Kalispell, Montana
People from Kalispell, Montana
Montana State University alumni
Living people
1978 births